Sini Anita Kyllikki Snellman (4 September 1924 – 24 February 2006) was a Finnish painter.

Biography
Snellman was born in Helsinki on 4 September 1924.  She studied at the Royal Academy of Arts in Helsinki, the Royal Swedish Academy of Fine Arts in Stockholm and at Académie Julian in Paris.

After spending time in Paris, she moved to Ibiza, where she bought an apartment in the late 1960s.

Snellman taught at the Academy of Fine Arts, Helsinki from 1971 to 1979.

She received the Pro Finlandia in 1976. In 1979 she established the Anita Snellman Foundation.

Snellman died on 24 February 2006 in Helsinki. She is buried in the Hietaniemi Cemetery in Helsinki.

Collections
Snellman's work is held in the following public collections in Finland:
 Ateneum Art Museum
 Amos Anderson Art Museum
 Lahti Museum
 Tampere Museum for Contemporary Art
 Oulu Museum of Art
 Joensuu Art Museum
 Imatra Art Museum
 Helsinki Art Museum
 Kuopio Art Museum
 Wihuri Foundation collection

References

Further reading
 Ahtola-Moorhouse, Leena (ed.): Anita Snellman 1924–2006. Helsinki: Anita Snellmanin säätiö, 2014. .

External links
 Images of Anita Snellman's paintings on Bukowskis Fine Art site

1924 births
2006 deaths
People from Ibiza
20th-century Finnish painters
Finnish expatriates in Spain
20th-century Finnish women artists
Burials at Hietaniemi Cemetery
Finnish women painters